Kahelqu (also Romanized as Kahelqū; also known as Bābā Qeshlāqī-ye Chūbānlār) is a village in Qeshlaq Rural District, Abish Ahmad District, Kaleybar County, East Azerbaijan Province, Iran. At the 2006 census, its population was 128, in 28 families.

References 

Populated places in Kaleybar County